Mother's Garden is a 2014 South Korean daily television drama starring Jeong Yu-mi, Choi Tae-joon, Uhm Hyun-kyung, Go Se-won and Go Doo-shim. It aired on MBC from March 17 to September 18, 2014, Monday through Friday at 20:50 for 126 episodes.

Plot
Seo Yoon-joo, the daughter of a family who owns a conglomerate, is a veterinarian who works specifically with horses. Yoon-joo has a cheerful and straightforward personality, and she is in love with Cha Ki-joon, the son of another rich family. Though Ki-joon is a second-generation chaebol, he secretly dreams of becoming a chef.

Cast
Jeong Yu-mi as Seo Yoon-joo
Choi Tae-joon as Cha Ki-joon
Uhm Hyun-kyung as Kim Soo-jin
Go Se-won as Cha Sung-joon
Go Doo-shim as Jung Soon-jung
Kil Yong-woo as Seo Byung-jin
Na Young-hee as Yoo Ji-sun
 Lee Hwa-kyum as Na Hye-rin
Dan Woo as Seo Jong-ha
Park Geun-hyung as Cha Dong-soo
Kim Chang-sook as Oh Kyung-sook
Choo So-young as Cha Bo-young
Kim Bo-ra as Kim Soo-ah
Jang Jung-hee as No-ra
Gong Jung-hwan as Byun Tae-soo
Lee El as Kim Ja-kyung
Choi Seung-yoon as Joong Goo
Kim Sa-kwon as Ha Dong-chang
Min Do-hee as Ha Ri-ra (cameo)

Awards and nominations

Notes

References

External links
  
Mother's Garden at MBC Global Media

2014 South Korean television series debuts
2014 South Korean television series endings
MBC TV television dramas
Korean-language television shows
South Korean melodrama television series
South Korean romance television series